The 1954 Wisconsin gubernatorial election was held on November 2, 1954.

Incumbent Republican Governor Walter J. Kohler Jr. defeated Democratic nominee William Proxmire in a rematch of the 1952 election with 51.45% of the vote.

Primary elections
Primary elections were held on September 14, 1954.

Democratic primary

Candidates
James Edward Doyle, former Chairman of the Wisconsin Democratic Party
William Proxmire, Democratic nominee for Governor in 1952

Results

Republican primary

Candidates
Walter J. Kohler Jr., incumbent Governor

Results

General election

Candidates
William Proxmire, Democratic
Walter J. Kohler Jr., Republican
Arthur Wepfer, Socialist Labor

Results

References

Bibliography
 
 

1954
Wisconsin
Gubernatorial
November 1954 events in the United States